This is a list of the standing committees of the National Assembly of Nigeria. There are currently 57 standing committees in the Nigerian Senate, while the House of Representatives currently has 89 standing committees.

Standing Committees

Senate
 Senate Committee on Appropriation
 Senate Committee on Air Force
 Senate Committee on Health
 Senate Committee on Environment
 Senate Committee on Banking/Insurance
 Senate Committee on Marine transport
 Senate committee on National planning
 Senate Committee on Women Affairs
 Senate committee on finance
 Senate committee on integration and cooperation
 Senate Committee on Education
 Senate Committee on National security & Intelligence
 Senate Committee on Up Stream Petroleum Sector
 Senate Committee on Power
 Senate Committee on Federal Capital Territory (FCT)
 Senate Committee on Defence and Army
 Senate Committee on National Population
 Senate Committee on Works
 Senate Committee on Housing
 Senate Committee on Gas
 Senate Committee on Capital Market
 Senate Committee on Ethics
 Senate Committee on Information, Media and Publicity
 Senate Committee on Federal Character
 Senate Committee on Solid Minerals
 Senate Committee on Public Account
 Senate Committee on Industries
 Senate Committee on Commerce, Land Transport
 Senate Committee on Business and Rule Committee
 Senate Committee on Niger Delta Development Committee
 Senate Services Committee
 Senate Committee on Agriculture
 Senate Committee on Water Resources
 Senate Committee on Communication
 Senate Committee on Foreign Affairs
 Senate Committee on Science and Technology
 Senate Committee on Sports
 Senate Committee on Aviation
 Senate Committee on INEC Committee
 Senate Committee on Establishment and Public Services
 Senate Committee on Police Affairs
 Senate Committee on Drugs and Narcotics
 Senate Committee on Culture and Tourism

House of Representatives
 House Committee on Anti-Corn, National Ethics & Value
 House Committee on the Air Force
 House Committee on the Army
 House Committee on Aviation
 House Committee on Banking and Currency
 House Committee on the Capital Market
 House Committee on Commerce
 House Committee on Communication
 House Committee on Cooperation, Integration and NEPAD
 House Committee on Culture and Tourism
 House Committee on Defense
 House Committee on Drugs, Narcotics and Financial Crimes
 House Committee on Education
 House Committee on Electoral Matters
 House Committee on Employment and Productivity
 House Committee on the Environment
 House Committee on Ethics and Privilege
 House Committee on the Federal Executive Territory
 House Committee on Federal Character
 House Committee on Finance
 House Committee on Foreign Affairs
 House Committee on Gas
 House Committee on Government Affairs
 House Committee on Habitat
 House Committee on Health
 House Committee on Information and National Orientation
 House Committee on House Service
 House Committee on Housing and Habitat
 House Committee on Human Rights
 House Committee on Industries
 House Committee on Inter Parliamentary
 House Committee on Internal Affairs
 House Committee on Judiciary
 House Committee on Justice
 House Committee on Legislative Budget
 House Committee on Loans, Aid and Debt Management
 House Committee on Marine Transport
 House Committee on National Planning and Population
 House Committee on National Security
 House Committee on the Navy
 House Committee on Niger Delta Development
 House Committee on Peace and National Reconciliation
 House Committee on Petroleum Resources (Down Stream)
 House Committee on Petroleum Resources (UpStream)
 House Committee on Police Affairs
 House Committee on Poverty Alleviation
 House Committee on Power
 House Committee on Privatization and Commercialization
 House Committee on Public Account
 House Committee on Public Petition
 House Committee on Public Service Matters
 House Committee on Rules & Business
 House Committee on Rural Development
 House Committee on Science and Technology
 House Committee on Solid Mineral
 House Committee on Special Duties
 House Committee on Sports
 House Committee on State and Local Government Affairs
 House Committee on Transport
 House Committee on Water Resources
 House Committee on Women's Affairs
 House Committee on Works
 House Committee on Local Content
 House Committee on Diaspora

Joint
 Joint Committee on Agriculture and Rural Development
 Joint Committee on Labour and Productivity, Petroleum Resources and Justice
 Joint Committee on Finance, Appropriation and Electoral Matters
 Joint Committee on Health and Commerce

References

External links
 Committees of the House of Representatives
 Committees of the Senate

National Assembly (Nigeria)
National Assembly